Steinkopf is a hill of Hesse, Germany.

Mountains of Hesse
Reinhardswald